Jennifer Song (born 2 January 1983) is a South Korean-born Canadian synchronized swimmer who competed in the 2008 Summer Olympics.

References

1983 births
Living people
Canadian synchronized swimmers
Canadian sportspeople of Korean descent
Canadian people of South Korean descent
Olympic synchronized swimmers of Canada
Synchronized swimmers at the 2008 Summer Olympics
Swimmers from Seoul
South Korean synchronized swimmers
Place of birth missing (living people)
Pan American Games medalists in synchronized swimming
Synchronized swimmers at the 2007 Pan American Games
Pan American Games silver medalists for Canada
Medalists at the 2007 Pan American Games